Whittingham is a closed station on the Main North railway line in New South Wales.

It opened on 6 September 1869 as Falkner's Platform. It was upgraded from a platform to a station and renamed Whittingham in February 1877, at which time a ticket office and waiting room was built and stationmaster appointed. It was for many years the railway access point for the Singleton Army Camp. From 1921 to 1931, it was also an access point for the Singleton Racing Club's short-lived Whittingham Racecourse, which was adjacent to the station. A minor derailment occurred at the station in 1945 when a shunting engine went through the points. It closed at an unknown date and the station was demolished.

Coal 
A junction was built at Whittingham in the 1970s for a coal branch to a coal mine at Mount Thorley and later for other mines.

References 

Disused regional railway stations in New South Wales
Railway stations in the Hunter Region
Railway stations in Australia opened in 1869
Main North railway line, New South Wales